Two ships of the United States Navy have been named USS Hamlin, after Hamlin Sound near Charleston, South Carolina.

, was an escort carrier loaned to the United Kingdom in 1942 and operated as HMS Stalker until 1945, later being sold and converted to a merchant ship
, was a seaplane tender in service from 1944 to 1947

United States Navy ship names